Chicopee is a city located on the Connecticut River in Hampden County, Massachusetts, United States. As of the 2020 census, the city had a population of 55,560, making it the second-largest city in Western Massachusetts after Springfield. Chicopee is part of the Springfield, Massachusetts Metropolitan Statistical Area. The communities of Chicopee Center (Cabotville), Chicopee Falls, Willimansett, Fairview, Aldenville, Burnett Road, Smith Highlands and Westover are located within the city.

One of the ventures of the Boston Associates, Chicopee is a city built around several smaller former mill communities on its namesake, the Chicopee River. During the 19th century, the city was home to the first American producer of friction matches as well as a variety of other industries, including the Ames Manufacturing Company, an early pioneer in machining lathes, building upon the work of Springfield's Thomas Blanchard, and the largest producer of swords and cutlasses for the Union Army during the Civil War. By the start of the 20th century, the city was home to a number of industrial plants, including those of the Fisk Tire Company, one of the largest tire makers of that time, and some of the earliest sporting goods factories of A. G. Spalding.

Today the city is home to a variety of specialty manufacturers, as well as Westover Air Reserve Base, the largest Air Force Reserve Base of the United States, built in 1940 with the emergence of World War II. Chicopee today goes by the nickname the "Crossroads of New England" as part of a business-development marketing campaign, one that West Springfield also uses. The name reflects the city's location among a number of metropolitan areas and its transportation network. Four interstate highways run through its boundaries, including I-90, I-91, I-291, and I-391, as well as state routes such as Route 33, 116, and 141.

Name
The city is named after the Chicopee River, a tributary that flows into the Connecticut River at the confluence on its boundaries. "Chicopee" is derived from the Nipmuc language, probably from the words chekee ("violent") and pe ("waters") in most Algonquian dialects, with reference to rapids. The Nipmuc are the indigenous people who occupied this area before the arrival of European colonists.

Alternatively, chikkuppee ("of cedar") may be the adjective form of chickkup ("cedar").

History

Nayasett (Cabotville and Chicopee Falls)

In 1636, William Pynchon purchased land from the Agawam Indians on the east side of the Connecticut River. He moved from the Town of Roxbury to Springfield to found the first settlement in the area that comprises the territory of today's Chicopee Center (Cabotville). Both Cabotville and the Falls were developed as manufacturing centers (villages).

According to local historian Charles J. Seaver, the area above the falls was first settled in 1660. The land purchased from the Indians was divided into districts. Nayasett (Nipmuc for "at the small point/angle") was the name given to the area of what are now Chicopee Center and Chicopee Falls. The settlement in the upper district was at Skipmuck (possibly based on Nipmuc Skipmaug, meaning "chief fishing place" or Shipmuck, meaning "big watery place"), a place above the falls on the south side of the river.

Colonists built a sawmill as the first industrial site along the river. The mill was built at Skenungonuck (Nipmuc for "green fields") Falls (now Chicopee Falls) in 1678 by Japhet Chapin, John Hitchcock and Nathaniel Foote.

In 1786, what was called Factory Village began to develop when two acres of land was leased to 10 local men, with the understanding that they would build an iron foundry within two years. This was accomplished and the business flourished.

In 1823, Jonathan Dwight purchased the water privilege at Skenungonuck Falls in Chicopee. He built a textile mill and five years later, it operated 14,000 spindles and nearly 500 looms, making it the second-largest operation in the state. It processed cotton from the Deep South, becoming part of the extended slave economy and King Cotton. By 1831, settlers had developed two giant dams, two waterpower canals, and two manufacturing communities on the Chicopee River.

In 1848, Chicopee, which for more than two centuries had been a part of the Town of Springfield, was separated and organized as a distinct town. Political factions in Springfield wanted that jurisdiction to remain a town, rather than become a city and take on a mayoral form of government. By partitioning Chicopee, those political factions prevented Springfield from becoming a city until 1852. The result was that Springfield lost 2/5 of its land area and nearly half of its population when Chicopee was created.

Before and after the partition, eight Chicopee River companies gained product recognition around the globe: Ames, Belcher, Lamb, Dwight, Stevens, Spalding, Fisk, and Duryea. Below the falls, in the bend of the river at a place called Factory Village, an important chapter of the region's industrial history was played out.

Various industries

Chicopee adopted the motto "Industriae Variae", which means "Various Industries". Chicopee's industries included cotton mills, woolen mills, textiles, brass and iron foundries, paper making, footwear factories, for leather boots and shoes, the first friction matches, and ship building. In nearby South Hadley Canal, the firearms company Crescent-Davis specialized in producing double-barrel shotguns.

The Ames Manufacturing Company made many machines and bronze cannons, and more swords than any other American manufacturer at the time. Ames cast a number of bronze statues, including Thomas Ball's monumental equestrian statue of President George Washington, installed in Boston's Public Garden. Ames was a major provider of cannon to the Union army during the Civil War. The Stevens Arms plant (later Savage) was responsible for most of the No. 4 Enfields manufactured for the British under Lend-Lease. Chicopee was home to production of the first gasoline-powered automobile made in the United States, the Duryea.

Bicycles

During the late nineteenth century, Chicopee Falls became a major manufacturing center of bicycles. The town was the site of at least two bicycle factories: The Overman Wheel Company (1882 to about 1899), and the Spalding sporting goods company.

Albert H. Overman moved his bicycle production from Hartford, Connecticut, to Chicopee Falls in 1883. The Overman company benefited from the surging popularity of the safety bicycle during the bicycle boom of the 1890s. At its height in 1894, Overman's factory employed over 1,200 workers. The boom eventually went bust, as overproduction drove the price of bicycles down. By 1901 the Overman firm was out of business.

Library

Chicopee was the first city west of Boston to form a publicly funded public library. The Chicopee Public Library was formed by a donation to the city by the Cabotville Institute.

Neighborhoods

Willimansett
In 1641, Willian Pynchon expanded his 1636 holdings by buying the land from the Chicopee River north to the Willimansett (Nipmuc for "good berries place" or "place of red earth") Brook. Land sales in Chicopee were recorded in 1659, but apparently no homes were built immediately.

Winthrop McKinstry writes that the sons of Deacon Samuel Chapin appear to be the first home builders. Henry Chapin is believed to have constructed his at Exchange and West streets (lower Chicopee) in 1664, and Japhet Chapin north of what is now known as James Ferry Road (upper Chicopee) in 1673. It is apparent from McKinstry's book that the Chapin family dominated the area north of the Chicopee River for the settlement's first 70 years. Chicopee Street was part of the First Parish in Springfield.

By the 1750s, Quabbin Road (now McKinstry Avenue) allowed the farmers to access the meadows and fields on the plains at the top of the hill. The Chapins used the land in common for grazing livestock and built ice houses near several large ponds. The ponds were drained by several brooks which flowed into the Connecticut River.

At the end of the 19th century, the city voted to build the Willimansett Bridge, connecting Willimansett with Holyoke across the Connecticut River. The results were profound. Willimansett and Aldenville would develop close ties to Holyoke; even postal and telephone service were (and still are) tied to the "Paper City." The legislative act ordering the building of the bridge was passed in 1892. L.L. Johnson reports that the completion of the bridge was grandly celebrated.

By the 20th century, Willimansett village had developed into quintessential Americana with a high percentage of French Canadian inhabitants. In total, Chicopee became four distinct commercial and political sub-divisions, each with its own ethnic makeup representing its own special interests and, much too frequently, in conflict with each other.

Located between Fairview and Willimansett, the Smith Highlands section once had its own school (first and second grades), Holyoke Street Railway bus service from Ingham Street across Irene, Factory, and Prospect streets, and two locally owned markets. The former Robert's Pond swimming area was a popular summer attraction, and the fields where the current Bellamy Junior High School is located were a popular sledding and skiing location winters.

Fairview
Fairview is the northernmost neighborhood (village) in Chicopee and originally included the lands that are now part of Westover ARB. Primarily agricultural, Fairview was known for its tobacco farms. After 1939, Westover helped to rapidly develop the village into a residential and commercial district. Memorial Drive (Route 33) flows north–south connecting Chicopee Falls with South Hadley.

Aldenville
On August 18, 1870, Edward Monroe Alden purchased 600 acres of land just east of Willimansett for the sum of $9,000 with the intent to create a "little city on the hill," which would become Aldenville. In 1890, he began laying out streets which he named for family members and divided the land up into 60-by-170 feet lots. French-Canadian factory workers from Chicopee Falls, Cabotville (Chicopee Center), and Holyoke began to build up the community. Sold for a selling price of $150 with $10 down, the first house was bought and built by French-Canadian builder and carpenter Marcellin Croteau.

Partition from Springfield and modern history

The villages of Cabotville, Chicopee Falls, Willimansett, and Fairview (and the lands that would become Aldenville) remained a part of Springfield, Massachusetts, from 1636 until 1848, when they were partitioned to form the Town of Chicopee. Political factions in Springfield had wished to keep Springfield a town, instead of becoming a city, which would give it a mayoral form of government. To keep Springfield sufficiently unpopulated to avoid a state regulation that would have required it to become a city, they created Chicopee, which contained approximately two-fifths of Springfield's land area and nearly half of its population. Despite the partition, Springfield became a city only four years later. Both cities continued to flourish for over a century after the partition.

On April 18, 1890, the community was granted a charter as a city by the Massachusetts General Court. George Sylvester Taylor (1822–1910) became Chicopee's first mayor on January 5, 1891.

Westover Field was created by a war-readiness appropriation signed by president Franklin D. Roosevelt in 1939. The site used to be tobacco crop fields east of and part of Fairview, east of Aldenview, and northern Willimansett. It was assigned to the United States Army Air Corps Northeast Air District. It was renamed Westover Air Force Base in 1948 after that Air Force's creation as a separate service. In 1974 SAC leadership turned the base over to the Air Force Reserve.

In 1991, St. Stanislaus Bishop and Martyr Church, located on Front Street, was proclaimed a minor basilica by Pope John Paul II.

Geography

Chicopee is located at  (42.170159, –72.588630).

The city is made up of several neighborhoods; the result of the city's origin as a collection of four villages in the northernmost part of Springfield, which seceded from it in 1848. Chicopee Falls, Chicopee Center (Cabotville), Fairview, and Willimansett continued to develop. In the early 1900s, Aldenville developed as a distinct community. Since then, the city has filled in most of its open space resulting in a number of new neighborhoods. These neighborhoods include Chicomansett, Ferry Lane, Sandy Hill and the geographically isolated Burnett Road neighborhood.

The city is bordered by Holyoke to the northwest, West Springfield to the southwest, Springfield to the south, Ludlow to the east, Granby to the northeast and South Hadley to the north.

The Chicopee River flows through the south part of the city, emptying into the Connecticut River. Many ponds, lakes, and streams are part of the Chicopee River or Connecticut River watersheds.

Willimansett, and portions of the Center and Falls are on low land, with Aldenville, Fairview, Westover, and the Burnett Road neighborhoods on an elevated plateau. At 288 feet, the highest elevation in the city is on Old Lyman Road, in the Fairview section.

Culture

Events

 The Great New England Air Show is an annual two-day air show held at Westover Air Reserve Base. 300,000 visitors attended in 2008 to a show that featured the USAF Thunderbirds. Approximately 210,000 attended the highly anticipated 2012 show, Although no major jet team headlined the show, military demonstrations by the F/A-18F Super Hornet, F-15C Eagles, V-22 Osprey, B-2 Spirit Stealth Bomber, and a locally based C-5 Galaxy along with civilian aerobatics and warbirds kept spectators entertained; over 60 aircraft were on static display making it the biggest airshow to take place at that location since 1974. The next air show was July 14 and 15, 2015 celebrating the 75th anniversary of Westover ARB with the US Navy's Blue Angels headlining in their first appearance at the base.
 The Sword Game is an annual football game that began in 1964 after the founding of Chicopee's second high school, Chicopee Comprehensive High School. It is held every fall between Chicopee High School and Chicopee Comprehensive High School. The city's mayor presents the winning team with the Mayor's Sword, a sword that was manufactured in the 1890s by Ames Manufacturing Company in Cabotville.
 The World Kielbasa Festival is a four-day fair featuring Polish food, polka dancing, games, and rides. The original K-Fest was held by the Chicopee Chamber of Commerce's Fireball Club and ran from 1974 until 1997. It was dormant for years, and then revived and held at Szot Park in May 2015. In May 2016, Chicopee's Kielbasa Festival became part of a larger cultural event when it was moved to the Big E grounds in West Springfield.

Sites

 Ames Tower in Cabotville, part of the Ames Manufacturing facilities and is now part of the Ames Privilege Apartment complex.
 Frank J. Szot Memorial Park, a focal point for community events in the city with accommodations for baseball, basketball, and picnicking. The stadium is typically used for local and regional soccer and football games. Features include a pond, one WWII and one Cold War era tank, several war monuments, and a fountain.
Chicopee Memorial State Park, located in the Burnett Road neighborhood and used to be known as the Cooley Brook Reservoir and Watershed, the park has been developed into a high use active recreation area. The total area is  including two  ponds. Activities include swimming, fishing, picnicking, jogging and biking.
 The Basilica of Saint Stanislaus, located on Front Street, is a 1908 brownstone, cathedral-like church built in the Baroque Revival Style of architecture. It is regarded as one of the most imposing churches in the area. The interior of the church can accommodate approximately 800 worshipers in the main and two side naves. A pipe organ was installed in the choir loft in 1920. During the parish's 1991 centennial, Pope John Paul II designated it a Minor Basilica.
 The Cabotville Historic Sycamore Trees, trees that were present when Chicopee became a town in 1848, matured when it became a city in 1890. They were designated Heritage Trees in 1999 by the Commonwealth of Massachusetts.
 The Chicopee Canal Walk, dedicated on May 21, 2010, is a  pedestrian walkway and mini park that follows the canal from the Cabotville Historic Sycamore Trees to Grape Street. The path follows a portion of a former industrial railway. Plans are to extend the path to the Deady Bridge, creating a bicycle and pedestrian route connecting Cabotville and Chicopee Falls.

 The Chicopee City Hall, built in 1871 in the Romanesque style. It was added to the National Register of Historic Place on July 30, 1974.
 The Chicopee War Memorial, located off of the intersection of Bonneville Avenue and Front Street. It is home to several statues and monuments to World War II veterans and Vietnam War veterans.
 The Edward Bellamy House, a National Historic Landmark at 91–93 Church Street in Chicopee Falls, Massachusetts. The house was built in 1852 and was the home of journalist Edward Bellamy. The house was added to the National Register of Historic Places and designated a National Historic Landmark in 1971.
 The Emerson Gaylord Mansion, a historic mansion is located at the north edge of the Elms College campus on the corner of Springfield and Fairview Streets (199 Springfield Street). It is described by Kristin O'Connell ("The Architectural Heritage of Chicopee") as a less pure example of the French Second Empire style, because of its asymmetrical exterior and its unusually high steep roof.
 The Facemate Tower, a historic tower on the Chicopee River in Chicopee Falls. It used to be a part of the Facemate Industrial Complex.
 The Polish Center of Discovery and Learning, a local history museum celebrating contributions made to the economy, arts, and sciences by immigrant Poles and their ancestors in Western New England. The museum also sponsors regular workshops, exhibits, concerts, conferences, seminars, films, plays, and lectures regarding the cultural traditions, contributions, and history of Poland, the Polish people, and the Polish diaspora.
 The Uniroyal Office Building, a historic building in Chicopee Falls that was part of the Uniroyal Industrial Complex.
 The Willimansett Dike, an elevated, artificial levee in Willimansett, built after the destructive Willimansett flood caused by The Great New England Hurricane of 1938. It stretches from Nash Field, following the Connecticut River south to I-90 bridge adjacent to the Chicopee boat ramp.
Westover Air Reserve Base, built here in 1940. Originally an Army Air Corps and later Army Air Forces installation known as Westover Field, it became Westover Air Force Base when the Air Force became an independent service in 1947. From 1955 until 1974, it was a Strategic Air Command (SAC) installation. Transferred to the Air Force Reserve in 1974, it was renamed Westover Air Reserve Base and is now the home of the 439th Airlift Wing, flying the C-5 Galaxy aircraft. Westover has one of the largest runways on the east coast at 11,597 x  and is the largest Air Force Reserve base in the United States. A joint civil-military facility, it is also home to Westover Metropolitan Airport. Two military-minded youth programs, the Young Marines and the Westover Composite Squadron of the Civil Air Patrol are also located at Westover.

Economy

Chicopee is mostly a service economy with a mixture of small, local businesses and national chains. The city is also home to a number of Polish-American food product manufacturers, reflecting the city's history, and include the Chicopee Provision Company, a major producer of Polish sausage kielbasa under the Blue Seal brand, Millie's Pierogi, a producer of those traditional Polish dumplings, and Domin & Sons, the region's largest producer of horseradish, whose largest market was Polish consumers at Easter.

Despite changes in the global economy, Chicopee does remain home to manufacturers including Callaway Golf which produces more than 5 million golfballs a year at its Willimansett production plant. Since 2013, Chicopee has been home to the headquarters of the Chemex Corporation, makers of the Chemex pour-over coffeemaker, which has been produced with the same design since 1941. Chicopee also hosts the Buxton Company, which "designs, manufactures, and markets personal leather goods, travel kits, and gifts collections for men and women." Founded as L.A.W. Novelty Co. in 1898, the firm changed its name to Buxton Co., LLC in 1921.

Chicopee is home to a handful of financial businesses as well including Alden Credit Union, The Polish National Credit Union and Chicopee Savings Bank. Chicopee Savings Bank is run by Chicopee Bancorp, which operates trades as CBNK on the NASDAQ exchange.

The Chicopee River Business Park and Westover Business Park are within the city's boundaries.

Demographics 

As of the census of 2010, Chicopee was 3.1% black, 1.6% Asian, 18.5% Hispanic or Latino of any race, 75% white

As of the census of 2000, there were 54,653 people, 23,117 households, and 14,147 families residing in the city. The racial makeup of the city was 89.82% White, 2.28% African American, 0.20% Native American, 0.87% Asian, 0.10% Pacific Islander, 4.90% from other races, and 1.84% from two or more races. Hispanic or Latino of any race were 8.76% of the population (12.8% Puerto Rican, 0.5% Dominican, 0.4% Mexican, 0.2% Colombian). Chicopee is the second largest municipality in Western Massachusetts, after Springfield (defining Western Massachusetts as Hampden, Hampshire, Franklin, and Berkshire counties).

There were 23,117 households, out of which 26.5% had children under the age of 18 living with them, 42.6% were married couples living together, 14.2% had a female householder with no husband present, and 38.8% were non-families. 32.7% of all households were made up of individuals, and 14.1% had someone living alone who was 65 years of age or older. The average household size was 2.32 and the average family size was 2.96.

In the city, the population was spread out, with 22.6% under the age of 18, 8.5% from 18 to 24, 28.8% from 25 to 44, 22.5% from 45 to 64, and 17.6% who were 65 years of age or older. The median age was 39 years. For every 100 females, there were 90.7 males. For every 100 females age 18 and over, there were 87.1 males.

The median income for a household in the city was $35,672, and the median income for a family was $44,136. Males had a median income of $35,585 versus $25,975 for females. The per capita income for the city was $18,646. About 9.6% of families and 12.3% of the population were below the poverty line, including 19.5% of those under age 18 and 9.3% of those age 65 or over.

Government and Politics

Chicopee has a mayor-council form of government, with a City Council for its legislative branch and a Mayor for its executive branch.

The City Council consists of nine Ward Councilors and four Councilors-at-Large. One Ward Councilor is elected from each ward. The four Councilors-at-Large are elected by all voters in the city. Ward Councilors serve one-year terms, while Councilors-at-Large serve two-year terms. Mayors serve one two-year term. Since 1941, local elections in Chicopee have been non-partisan. From 1890 to 1914, the city had a bicameral legislature consisting of eight wards, with one member of the Board of Aldermen and two members of the Common Council elected from each ward. The city replaced this system by abolishing the Common Council and adding ten aldermen-at-large to the Board of Aldermen. In 2008, the Board of Aldermen approved a home-rule petition to change the legislature's name to the City Council. The name change took effect in 2009.

Chicopee also directly elects the following local offices and bodies:
 A City Clerk elected to one three-year term
 City Collector elected to one three-year term
 A City Treasurer elected to one three-year term
 Three Assessors elected to one three-year term
 A School Committee with two Members-at-Large and nine Ward Members, all elected to one three-year term

Voter Registration

Education

College of Our Lady of the Elms
The College of Our Lady of the Elms is a four-year liberal arts college offering thirty-three academic majors. It was first founded in 1897 as a girls' preparatory academy in Pittsfield, the Academy of Our Lady of the Elms. In 1899, it moved to Chicopee as St. Joseph's Normal College. A charter for the school to operate as a women's liberal arts college was approved in 1928, and the name was changed to the College of Our Lady of the Elms. It began admitting men in 1998.

Private elementary
Chicopee has a multitude of Catholic schools that are operated under the Diocese of Springfield. These schools include: Saint Joan of Arc School which serves Saint Rose de Lima Church on Grattan Street; and Saint Stanislaus School which serves the St. Stanislaus Bishop & Martyr's Parish Bishop and Martyr on Front Street.

Within the past decade, a number of private elementary schools and their associated parishes have closed. These include Assumption School which served the former Assumption of the Blessed Virgin Mary parish, Saint Patrick's School which served the former Saint Patrick's parish (closure of this parish is currently in dispute), Holy Name School which served Holy Name of Jesus parish, Mount Carmel School which served the Nativity of the Blessed Virgin Mary parish, and Saint George School which served Saint George's parish that merged with Saint Rose de Lima / Saint Joan of Arc School.

Private secondary

Holyoke Catholic High School was founded in 1963 at the campus of the former Saint Jerome High School in Holyoke. In 2002 it relocated to the campus of Saint Hyacinth Seminary in Granby. It moved to its Holyoke location in September 2008, and 2015 it merged with Cathedral High School to form a new regional Catholic school that was completed in 2016 as Pope Francis High School in Springfield.

In 2019 Paulo Freire Social Justice Charter School moved from Holyoke to occupy the building that was left vacant when Pope Francis moved to its new building a couple years earlier.

Notable people

 Nathan Peabody Ames, American swordsmith and founder of the Ames Manufacturing Company
 Scott Barnes, pitcher for Major League Baseball's Toronto Blue Jays
 Fred Belcher, American Race Car Driver, ran in the inaugural Indianapolis 500 
 Edward Bellamy, author, most known for 1888's Looking Backward
 Teddy Charles, musician
 Duryea brothers, Charles Duryea (1861–1938) and Frank Duryea (1869–1967), were the first to build an automobile in the United States
 Damien Fahey, television and radio personality, former host of MTV's TRL
 Ray Fitzgerald, Major League Baseball player
 Sabina Gadecki, actress
 George S. Irving, actor and singer
 Joe Jackson, gridiron football player
 Philip Labonte, musician, vocalist for All That Remains
 Arthur MacArthur Jr., Army General
 Victoria Principal, attended Chicopee Comprehensive High School through her junior year, 1968
George D. Robinson, Former Massachusetts Governor and defense counsel of Lizzie Borden
 Garry St. Jean, former NBA basketball coach for the Sacramento Kings

See also 
 Al's Diner
 Ames Manufacturing Company
 Cabotville Common Historic District
 Carreau Block
 Chicopee Falls Dam
 Dwight Manufacturing Company Housing District
 Overman Wheel Company
 List of mill towns in Massachusetts
 Polish Cathedral style
 Polish National Home
 Springfield Street Historic District
 Belcher Lodge
 Valentine School
 Westover Metropolitan Airport
 Willimansett Bridge

References

Further reading
 Shlakman. Vera. Economic History of a Factory Town: A Study of Chicopee, Massachusetts (1935)
Kessler-Harris, Alice. "Vera Shlakman, Economic History of a Factory Town, A Study of Chicopee, Massachusetts (1935)", International Labor & Working-Class History Spring 2006, Issue 69, pp. 195–200

External links 

 
 Chicopee local news and community events
 Chicopee Public Library

 
Cities in Massachusetts
Cities in Hampden County, Massachusetts
Massachusetts populated places on the Connecticut River
Populated places established in 1640
Springfield metropolitan area, Massachusetts
1640 establishments in Massachusetts
Polish communities in the United States